The Grant Building is 40-story,  skyscraper at 310 Grant Street in downtown Pittsburgh, Pennsylvania. The building was completed and opened on February 1, 1929 at a cost of $5.5 million ($ million today). The Art Deco building's facade is built with Belgian granite, limestone, and brick. A smaller version of the beacon, still flashing out the name of the city remains to this day, although malfunctions with the relay switch caused it to spell "P-I-T-E-T-S-B-K-R-R-H", and eventually "T-P-E-B-T-S-A-U-R-G-H" before being repaired on July 27, 2009.

The tower on the roof also served as the broadcast antenna for radio station KDKA Pittsburgh which made the first commercially licensed radio broadcast on election night of 1920.  At 7:00 AM on its 14th birthday (February 2, 1934), the radio station inaugurated new studios on the Grant Building's third floor.

Huntington National Bank, which operates a branch inside the tower, owns the signage rights, giving them two signs in the Pittsburgh skyline alongside Centre City Tower where Huntington has their Western Pennsylvania headquarters.

Gallery

See also 
 List of tallest buildings in Pittsburgh
 List of state and county courthouses in Pennsylvania

References

Further reading

External links

 Grant Building at Skyscrapers.com
 

Office buildings completed in 1929
Skyscraper office buildings in Pittsburgh
Henry Hornbostel buildings
Art Deco architecture in Pennsylvania